Protein BAT2-like is a protein that in humans is encoded by the BAT2L gene.

Interactions 

KIAA0515 has been shown to interact with EHMT2.

References

Further reading